Ettan Fotboll, or simply Ettan, which also is its common name in everyday speech, is the third level in the Swedish football league system and consists of 32 Swedish football teams. It was formerly simply known as Division 1. Division 1 was the second tier from 1987 to 1999, but was replaced by Superettan in 2000. It was reestablished for the 2006 season as the third tier below Superettan.

History
The old Division 1 replaced Division 2 as the second highest level in 1987 and consisted of two separate leagues with 14 teams each, Norra (Northern) and Södra (Southern), except for the 1991 and 1992 seasons which comprised 32 teams in four leagues, adding Östra (Eastern) and Västra (Western). As of the 2018 season, both Norra and Södra leagues of Ettan are composed of 16 clubs, similar to Allsvenskan and Superettan.

The competition
There are 32 clubs in Ettan, divided in two groups of 16 teams each representing Northern and Southern Sweden. During the course of a season (starting in April and ending in November) each club plays the others twice, once at their home stadium and once at that of their opponents, for a total of 30 games. At the end of each season the three lowest placed teams of each group are relegated to Division 2 and the six winning teams from the six Division 2 leagues are promoted in their place. The top team in each Ettan group is promoted to Superettan and the two lowest placed teams from Superettan are relegated in their place. The second placed teams in each Ettan group plays a promotion/relegation play-off against the third and fourth lowest teams in Superettan.

Current clubs (2021 season)

Stadia and locations

Norra

Södra

 1 Correct as of end of 2018 season

Seasons: previous winners

Second tier

Third tier 

Note: In 2007 the runners up were promoted automatically without playoffs because of Allsvenskan expanding to 16 teams.

Statistics

Top goalscorers Norra

Top goalscorers Södra

References

External links
 Official Ettan Website

 
Sports leagues established in 2006
2006 establishments in Sweden
Third level football leagues in Europe
Professional sports leagues in Sweden